Indian National Congress (Requisitionists) was created in 1969; it was created and led by Indira Gandhi.  Initially this party was known as Congress (R), but it soon came to be generally known as the New Congress or Syndicate.

The letter 'R' stands for 'Requisition'.  The original congress party then became the Indian National Congress (Organisation), or Congress (O), and was led by Kamaraj. It was informally called the Old Congress or Syndicate and retained the party symbol of a pair of bullocks carrying a yoke.  Mrs. Gandhi's breakaway faction were given a new symbol of a cow with suckling calf by the Election Commission as the party election symbol.

The split occurred when, in 1969, a united opposition under the banner of Samyukt Vidhayak Dal, won control over several states in the Hindi belt. Indira Gandhi, Prime Minister and daughter of Jawaharlal Nehru, was then challenged by the majority of the party leadership. Gandhi formed the new party to demonstrate her support amongst the people.  In the 1971 general election, Congress (R) had secured an overwhelming majority winning 352 out of 518 seats in the Lok Sabha.  In the elections to five state assemblies too, the Congress (R) performed well. Later in 1970s the name Congress (R) evolved to Congress (I) the 'I' stands for Indira and gradually Congress (I) became Indian National Congress, as Congress (O) merged with Janata Party. Other parties split from Congress party were Congress for Democracy, Indian National Congress (Urs) etc.

See also 
Indian National Congress breakaway parties
Indian National Congress

Notes

Indian National Congress breakaway groups
The Emergency (India)